"Easy Please Me" is a song by British singer-songwriter Katy B from her debut album On a Mission (2011). It was released as the album's fourth single on 3 June 2011, and reached number 25 in the UK charts.

Music video
The music video was released on 21 May 2011, and features Katy and two friends in a pool club. Katy does various activities including hustling at pool, then she and her friends are chased out by a bailiff at the end and escape with money as they drive off.

Composition
The song is written in pure harmonic minor, which is a rare instance in popular music. Its key signature is Bb minor and it follows the harmonic chord progression of F—Bbm—Gb—Ebm—F (the Ebm is a passing chord). The song has an electronica influence. It provides a subtle vocal harmony, extensive vamping and emphasis on instrumental arranging.

Track listing

Charts

Weekly charts

Year-end charts

Release history

References

Katy B songs
2011 singles
Songs written by Benga (musician)
Songs written by Skream
Song recordings produced by Magnetic Man
Songs written by Katy B
2011 songs
Columbia Records singles